Shiv Gautam (born 29 October 1988) is an Indian first-class cricketer who plays for Jharkhand.

References

External links
 

1988 births
Living people
Indian cricketers
Jharkhand cricketers
People from Ranchi
Cricketers from Jharkhand
Wicket-keepers